Natasha Farrant is a British children's author. For her book, Voyage of the Sparrowhawk, she won the 2020 Costa Children's Book Award.

Farrant is three-quarters French, and was born in London. She earned a degree in Modern Languages from the University of Oxford, an MSc in Social Anthropology from the London School of Economics (LSE), and a Diploma in Translation from the Institute of Linguists.

Publications
Diving Into Light, 2012
Some Other Eden, 2012
The Things We Did for Love, 2012
After Iris, 2013
Flora in Love, 2014
All About Pumpkin, 2015
Lydia: The Wild Girl of Pride & Prejudice, 2016
Time for Jas, 2016
The Children of Castle Rock, 2018
Eight Princesses and a Magic Mirror, 2019
Voyage of the Sparrowhawk, 2020
The Girl Who Talked to Trees, 2021

Personal life
Farrant is married with two adult daughters, and lives in London.

References

External links

Living people
British children's writers
21st-century British women writers
Alumni of the University of Oxford
Alumni of the London School of Economics
Year of birth missing (living people)